Carl Nicks may refer to:
 Carl Nicks (basketball) (born 1958), retired NBA guard
 Carl Nicks (American football) (born 1985), retired guard for the New Orleans Saints and Tampa Bay Buccaneers